Mets is a surname of Estonian origin, meaning "Forest", and may refer to:

Arvo Mets (1937–1997), Russian poet of Estonian descent
Hillar Mets (born 1954), Estonian cartoonist, illustrator and animator
Karol Mets (born 1993), Estonian footballer

See also
Gertjan De Mets (born 1987), Belgian football player

Estonian-language surnames